Lebanon made its Paralympic Games début at the 2000 Summer Paralympics in Sydney, sending just two male representatives to compete in sprinting (T44 category). Hussein Ghandour was a non-starter in his race, while Mahmoud Habbal failed to complete his. Lebanon was absent from the 2004 Games, but returned in 2008, with a single competitor: Edward Maalouf, in cycling. Maalouf entered two events, and won bronze in each of them.

Lebanon has never taken part in any of the Winter Paralympics.

Full results for Lebanon at the Paralympics

See also
 Lebanon at the Olympics

References